Dazkarieh was a traditional Portuguese music band that began in 1999. The alternative rock and neofolk band consists of musicians Joana Negrão, Rui Rodrigues, João Campos and Vasco Ribeiro Casais. They have released a total of seven albums. Switzerland, Canada, Belgium, Mexico, Cape Verde, Czech Republic, Spain, Austria, Estonia and especially Germany, are some of the countries through which already exhibited their original sounds, inspired by various world cultures and based in the most diverse instruments, which include Galician gaita, accordion, western concert flute, tin whistle, African percussion instruments, Arabic percussion, bass and guitar. Initially the group was producing sounds that center on an imaginary vocal language, created by the group, for the purpose of treating the clear voice as a standalone instrument, comparable to the others.

Discography

2002 - Dazkarieh I 
 Abour Safar 
 kriamideah I 
 kriamideah II 
 kriamideah III 
 Elgtue 
 Gherunaai 
 Troligh ol 'Jighil I
 Troligh ol 'Jighil II 
 Miafarê Boi
 Cly

2004 - Dazkarieh II - Espanta Espíritos 
 Sansorgui 
 Orubamba 
 Rosa de Lava 
 Zahrany 
 Nangbar
 Mìura 
 Dazambra 
 Naty 
 Na Sei

2006 - Incógnita Alquimia 
 Senhora da Azenha 
 Nyckel Power 
 Meninas Vamos à Murta 
 Água-Mãe 
 Olhos de Maré 
 Cantaria 
 Na Boca do Lobo 
 Cadafalso 
 HG From Hell 
 Estrela de Cinco Pontas 
 Incógnita Alquimia 
 Vitorina

2009 - Hemisférios

CD1
 Intro
 Caminhos Turvos
 Lua Imersa
 Instantes
 Longe, em Segredo
 Sáfaro 
 Água Forte 
 Voo Longe 
 Sinapse 
 Leve Accordar

CD2
 Intro
 Baile da Meia Volta
 Eras Tão Bonita
 Coroar
 Virgem
 Borda d´Água (Prelúdio)
 Borda d´Água 
 Sanfona 
 Alvorada Sanabresa / Antigo Baile Agarrado 
 Romance 
 Recordai 
 Embalo

2011 - Ruído do Silêncio 
 Lilaré dos Cinco Sentidos 
 Sons de Pó 
 Mazurka da Água 
 Tempo Chão 
 Da Minha Janela 
 Moda da Ceifa 
 Moda da Ceifa II 
 Manhãzinha de S. João 
 Repasseado da Calçada 
 Nas Tuas Mãos 
 Légua da Póvo 
 Ruído do Silêncio

2012 - Eterno Retorno 
 (Ir)Real
 Terra escura
 Embalo ao nascer do sol
 Quatro ciclos
 Sei que nao sei
 Guardar segredo
 Folha vazia
 Contos de cordel
 Tronco
 Sombra
 Ladainha do lago
 Primeiro olhar

2014 - Finisterra 
 A Senhora do Leite 
 Quase Um Repasseado 
 Divina Santa Cruz 
 Lá Cima Ó Castelo 
 Bravio
 Margaça
 Adufada
 Rumba Cega (with Cabra Çega)
 Melancolia
 Primeiro Olhar (with Matilde Castro)
 As Canseiras Desta Vida (Cover of José Mário Branco)

External links
Oficial page
Band in Myspace
Facebook

References

Portuguese musical groups
Musical groups established in 1999
1999 establishments in Portugal